Necochea is a port and beach city in the southwest of Buenos Aires Province, Argentina.

The neighboring Port of Quequén, located on the eastern bank of the Quequén Grande River, is one of the most important ports in Argentina, and the gateway for the agricultural production of the southeast of the Province of Buenos Aires.

Overview
The area around Necochea was first charted by Jesuit clergymen José Cardiel and Thomas Falkner, who reached the mouth of the Quequén Grande River in 1748. Necochea itself was established as a defensive outpost against Malón raids on October 12, 1881, by National Guard commander Ángel Murga. The new settlement was named in honor of General Mariano Necochea, a military commander during Argentine War of Independence. Founded on a seaside estate owned by Eustoquio Díaz Vélez, jr., the latter's father, General Eustoquio Díaz Vélez, had likewise played an important role during the struggle. A Buenos Aires Great Southern Railway station was opened in 1894, and the Díaz Vélez family established the Villa Díaz Vélez resort in 1902. The neighboring communities were incorporated into the town of Necochea in 1911.

A suspension bridge made Necochea accessible to motorists; inaugurated in 1929, the new bridge was named after President Hipólito Yrigoyen and was one of two identical suspension bridges in Argentina (the other being in Santa Fe). A tram service operated in the town between 1913 and 1940. The inaugural of Port Quequén in 1922 made the area a leading railhead for the agriculture of Argentina; the port handled a million tons of freight by 1954 and would grow to over 3 million tons by 1991.

Necochea became an important domestic tourism destination in Argentina during the 20th century, and the number of registered hotel rooms surpassed 50,000 by 2011; occupation by then exceeded 95% during the summer high season. The 640 hectare (1600 acre) Miguel Lillo Park, established in 1979, is the only public maritime forest nature reserve in Argentina. The park is also known for its swan's lake, tourist railway, and the Regional Historical Museum housed since 1981 in the Spanish Colonial Revival house originally belonging to the Díaz Vélez estancia.

Other local landmarks and attractions include seashore grottoes (notable among them Cueva del Tigre, named for a 19th-century gaucho who reputedly evaded authorities for years by hiding in the grotto later named for him); the Parish of Our Lady of Lourdes (consecrated in 1957); the Necochea Golf Club (founded in 1955); the Fishermen's Pier (1970); the Quequén Grande River rapids; and Quequén port, which features two breakwaters (1908), a lighthouse (1921), and a South American sea lion reserve. The casino was originally inaugurated in 1929; it was later housed in a modernist structure that opened in 1973 and was rebuilt after a 2001 fire, but which burn again in 2020 and no longer exists.

Some of the most popular recurring events in Necochea are the National Festival of Children's Shows (Fiesta Nacional de Espectáculos para Niños), held since 1962 at Miguel Lillo Park on each Epiphany Day (January 6); and the Festival of Cultures (Fiesta de las Colectividades), celebrating the contributions of the numerous immigrant communities and their descendants to both Necochea and Argentina. The festival, held at the end of January, includes stands representing the immigrant cultures common to much of Argentina (Italians, Spaniards,  Danish Argentines, Middle Easterners, and Germans, among others), as well as Chileans in the recent years.

Climate
Under the Köppen climate classification Necochea has a very warm oceanic climate with warm to hot summers and mild winters, with rainfall being spread over the year. The somewhat cool summer nights and the rainfall spread prevents it from being part of the various subtropical ranges.

Settlements
Quequén
Juan N.Fernández
Nicanor Olivera (Est. La Dulce)
Claraz
Ramón Santamarina
Balneario Los Angeles
Costa Bonita

Notable people
 Francisca Rojas

References

External links

 
 Diario Necochea, daily news from Necochea

Populated places in Buenos Aires Province
Populated coastal places in Argentina
Port settlements in Argentina
Seaside resorts in Argentina
Populated places established in 1881
Cities in Argentina
1881 establishments in Argentina
Argentina